is an umbrella term for all (ko-budō) schools of Japanese swordsmanship, in particular those that predate the Meiji Restoration. Some modern styles of kendo and iaido that were established in the 20th century also included modern forms of kenjutsu in their curriculum. Kenjutsu, which originated with the samurai class of feudal Japan, means "methods, techniques, and the art of the Japanese sword". This is opposed to kendo, which means "the way of the sword" and uses a bamboo sword (shinai) and protective armour (bōgu).

The exact activities and conventions undertaken when practicing kenjutsu vary from school to school, where the word school here refers to the practice, methods, ethics, and metaphysics of a given tradition, yet commonly include practice of battlefield techniques without an opponent and techniques whereby two practitioners perform kata (featuring full contact strikes to the body in some styles and no body contact strikes permitted in others).
Although kata training has always been the mainstay, in later periods, schools incorporated sparring under a variety of conditions, from using solid wooden bokutō to the use of a bamboo sword (shinai) and armor (bōgu). In modern times sparring in Japanese martial art is more strongly associated with kendo and is mainly practiced by students or the police force. Although kendo is common in Japan, it is also practiced in other countries around the world.

History

Early development
It is thought likely that the first iron swords were manufactured in Japan in the fourth century, based on technology imported from China via the Korean peninsula. While swords clearly played an important cultural and religious role in ancient Japan, in the Heian period the globally recognised curved Japanese sword (the katana) was developed and swords became important weapons and symbolic items. The oldest schools in existence today arose in the Muromachi period (1336 to 1573), known for long periods of inter-state warfare. Three major schools emerged during this period.

 Kage-ryū (Aizu) (Aisukage ryū)
Chūjō-ryū
 Tenshin Shōden Katori Shintō-ryū

These schools form the ancestors for many descendent styles, for example, from Ittō ryū has branched Ono-ha Ittō ryū and Mizoguchi-ha Ittō-ryū (among many others).

On the island of Okinawa, the art of Udundi includes a unique method of both Kenjutsu and Iaijutsu. This is the only surviving sword system from Okinawa. It was the martial art of the noble Motobu family during the Ryukyu Kingdom.

Edo period
During the Edo period schools proliferated to number more than 500, and training techniques and equipment advanced. The 19th century led to the development of the bamboo practice sword, the shinai, and protective armor, bogu. This allowed practice of full speed techniques in sparring, while reducing risk of serious harm to the practitioner. Before this, training in Kenjutsu had consisted mainly of basic technique practice and paired kata, using solid wooden practice swords (bokutō) or live blades.

Decline
Beginning in 1868, the Meiji Restoration led to the breakup of the military class and the modernization of Japan along the lines of western industrial nations. As the samurai class was officially dissolved at this time, kenjutsu fell into decline, an unpopular reminder of the past. This decline continued for approximately 20 years, until rising national confidence led to an increase of the uptake of traditional sword arts again, particularly in the military and the police.

In 1886 the Japanese Police gathered together kata from a variety of kenjutsu schools into a standardised set for training purposes. This process of standardization of martial training continued when, in 1895, a body for martial arts in Japan, the Dai Nippon Butoku Kai, was established. Work on standardizing kenjutsu kata continued for years, with several groups involved until in 1912 an edict was released by the Dai Nippon Butoku Kai. This edict highlighted a lack of unity in teaching and introduced a standard core teaching curriculum to which the individual kenjutsu schools would add their distinctive techniques. This core curriculum, and its ten kata evolved into the modern martial art of kendo. This point could be regarded as the end of the development of Kendo. Kata was provided for the unification of many schools to enable them to pass on the techniques and spirit of the Japanese sword.

20th and 21st century

With the increasing interest in Japanese martial arts outside Japan during the 20th century, people in other countries started taking an interest in kenjutsu.

Weapons
One of the more common training weapons is the wooden sword (bokuto or bokken). For various reasons, many schools make use of very specifically designed bokuto, altering its shape, weight and length according to the style's specifications. For example, bokuto used within Yagyū Shinkage-ryū are relatively thin and without a handguard in order to match the school's characteristic approach to combat. Alternatively, Kashima Shin-ryū practitioners use a thicker than average bokuto with no curvature and with a rather large hilt. This of course lends itself well to Kashima Shin-ryū's distinct principles of combat.

Some schools practice with fukuro shinai (a bamboo sword covered with leather or cloth) under circumstances where the student lacks the ability to safely control a bokuto at full speed or as a general safety precaution. In fact, the fukuro shinai dates as far back as the 15th century.

Nitōjutsu
Styles that teach it are called ; contrast .

The most famous exponent of nitōjutsu was Miyamoto Musashi (1584 – 1645), the founder of Hyōhō Niten Ichi-ryū, who advocates it in The Book of Five Rings. Nitōjutsu is not however unique to Hyoho Niten Ichi-ryū, nor was nitōjutsu the creation of Musashi. Both Tenshin Shōden Katori Shinto-ryū were founded in the early Muromachi period (ca. 1447), and Tatsumi-ryu founded Eishō period (1504–1521), contain extensive two-sword curricula while also preceding the establishment of Musashi’s school.

Notable historical Japanese practitioners

Sasaki Rui 佐々木累
Nakazawa Koto 中沢琴
Tatsumi Sankyo 立身三京
Nen-ami Jion 念阿弥慈恩
Iizasa Choisai Ienao 飯篠長威斎家直
Aidu Ikousai Hisatada 愛洲移香斎久忠
Kamiizumi Nobutsuna 上泉信綱
Moro-oka Ippa 諸岡一波
Tsukahara Bokuden 塚原卜伝
Ashikaga Yoshiteru 足利義輝
Togo Chui 東郷重位
Hikita Bungoro Kagetomo 疋田豊五郎景兼
Marume Kurando-no-Suke Nagayoshi  丸目蔵人佐長恵
Yagyū Sekishusai Muneyoshi 柳生石舟斎宗厳
Yagyū Tajima-no-kami Munenori 柳生但馬守宗矩
Yagyū Jūbei Mitsuyoshi 柳生十兵衛三義
Harigaya Sekiun 針ヶ谷夕雲
Itori Koun Tamenobu 井鳥巨雲為信
Chujo Nagahide 中条長秀
Toda Gorouzaemon Nyudo Seigen 富田五郎左衛門入道勢源
Ito Ittosai Kagehisa 伊藤一刀斎景久
Ono Jiroemon Tadaaki (Mikogami Tenzen) 小野次郎衛門忠明
Ono Jiroemon Tadatsune 小野次郎衛門忠常
Mikogami Tenzen 御子神典膳
Miyamoto Musashi 宮本武蔵玄信
Aoki Johemon Kaneie (Tetsujin) 青木城衛門金家 (鉄人)
Sasaki Ganryu佐々木岩流 (In Kodan (old Japanese storytelling), well known as Sasaki Kojiro)
Chiba Shusaku Narimasa 千葉周作成政
Momoi Shunzo Naoyoshi 桃井春蔵直由
Togasaki Teruyoshi 戸ケ崎暉芳 
Iba Hachiro Hidesato 伊庭八郎秀穎
Negishi Shingoro 根岸信五郎 (Last Edo period headmaster of Shinto Munen-ryu)
Kubota Suketaro Sugane 窪田助太郎清音
Ohishi Susumu Tanetsugu 大石進種次
Otani Seiichiro Nobutomo 男谷精一郎信友
Yamaoka Tesshu 山岡鉄舟
Okita Souji沖田総司
Shingai Tadaatsu真貝 忠篤
Sakakibara Kenkichi榊原 鍵吉
Nakayama Hakudo 中山博道
Kohno Sasaburou 高野佐三郎
Sasamori Junzo 笹森順造
Hayashizaki Jinsuke 林崎甚助

Popular culture
 Teenage Mutant Ninja Turtles features kenjutsu being used by Leonardo, Splinter, April O'Neil, Karai, the Shredder, etc. It was also used by Miyamoto Usagi who was an ally for the Turtles and their group as well as the main character of his own series.
 The title character of Samurai Jack included kenjutsu in his fighting style.
 Bruce Wayne learned kenjutsu from Henri Ducard / Ra's al Ghul on Batman Begins. His anime counterpart also used it on Batman Ninja.
 Kenjutsu was an inspiration for sword fighting in Power Rangers Ninja Storm and Power Rangers Samurai.
 Avengers: Endgame and Hawkeye features Hawkeye using kenjutsu.

See also

Angampora
Banshay
Bataireacht
Bōjutsu
Gatka
Jūkendō
Kalaripayattu
Kendo
Kenjutsu
Krabi–krabong
Kuttu Varisai
Mardani khel
Silambam
Silambam Asia
Tahtib
Thang-ta
Varma kalai
World Silambam Association
Japanese martial arts
Battōjutsu
Hokushin Ittō-ryū
Hyoho Niten Ichi-ryū
Iaijutsu
Kashima Shinden Jikishinkage-ryū
Kashima Shin-ryū
Kashima Shinto-ryū
Mizoguchi-ha Ittō-ryū
Maniwa Nen-ryū
Muso Jikiden Eishin ryu
Suiō-ryū
Samurai
Shindo Munen-ryu
Tatsumi-ryū
Tennen Rishin Ryu
Tenshin Shōden Katori Shintō-ryū
Yagyū Shinkage-ryū

Sources
 Classical Warrior Traditions of Japan – 3-volume set by Diane Skoss (Koryu Books):
 Koryu Bujutsu: Classical Warrior Traditions Of Japan 
 Sword & Spirit: Classical Warrior Traditions Of Japan, Volume 2 
 Keiko Shokon: Classical Warrior Traditions of Japan, Volume 3

References

External links

Japanese martial arts

Kendo
Ko-ryū bujutsu
Ninjutsu skills